The 17th Actors and Actresses Union Awards ceremony was held on 31 March 2008 at the Palacio de Congresos in Madrid.

In addition to the competitive awards, the  priest Enrique de Castro received the '' award whereas  the '' career award. Javier Bardem also was recognised by his peers for his recently won Academy Award, the first ever by a Spanish actor.

Winners and nominees 
The winners and nominees are listed as follows:

Film

Television

Theatre

Newcomers

References 

Actors and Actresses Union Awards
2008 in Madrid
2008 television awards
2008 film awards
2008 theatre awards
March 2008 events in Europe